Merenre Nemtyemsaf I (meaning "Beloved of Ra, Nemty is his protection") was an Ancient Egyptian pharaoh, the fourth king of the sixth dynasty. He ruled Egypt for six to 11 years in the 23rd century BC, succeeding his father Pepi I Meryre on the throne.

Family 
Merenre was the son of queen Ankhesenpepi I and king Pepi I, who probably begot him in his old age. Ankhesenpepi was a daughter of the nomarch of Abydos Khui and his wife Nebet whom Pepi I made into a vizier during his reign, the sole women of the Old Kingdom period known to have held such a title. Khui and Nebet's son, Merenre's uncle Djau served in the position of vizier under Merenre and Pepi II. 
Merenre had a full sister in princess Neith. Gustave Jéquier has proposed that Neith was married to Merenre, a possibility which Vivienne Callender observes is difficult to ascertain as Neith later remarried to Pepi II, explaining the absence of a tomb of her near Merenre's.

Sixth dynasty royal seals and stone blocks found at Saqqara demonstrate that Merenre's aunt, queen Ankhesenpepi II who married Pepy I was also married to Merenre. Since the South Saqqara Stone shows Merenre's reign intervened between Pepi I and Pepi II and lasted for a minimum of slightly over a decade, this indirectly indicates that Merenre I might have been Pepi II's father, rather than Pepi I as had been hitherto proposed. Merenre had at least one daughter, Ankhesenpepi III, who became the wife of Pepi II, and could also be the father of queen Iput II.

Reign

Chronology
The relative chronological position of Merenre Nemtyemsaf I within the sixth dynasty is secured. Historical sources and archaeological evidences agree that he succeeded Pepi I Meryre on the throne and was in turn succeeded by Pepi II Neferkare. For example, the near-contemporary South Saqqara Stone, a royal annals inscribed during the reign of either Merenre or Pepi II, gives the succession "Teti → Userkare → Pepi I → Merenre I", making Merenre the fourth king of the Sixth Dynasty. Two more historical sources agree with this chronology: the Abydos king list, written under Seti I which places Merenre I's cartouche as the 37th entry between those of Pepi I and Pepi II, and the Turin canon, a list of kings on papyrus dating to the reign of Ramses II which records Merenre I in the fourth column, third row.

Merenre's reign is difficult to date precisely in absolute terms. An absolute chronology referring to dates in our modern calendar is estimated by Egyptologists working backwards by adding reign lengths—themselves uncertain and inferred from historical sources and archaeological evidence—and, in a few cases, using ancient astronomical observations and radiocarbon dates. These methodologies do not agree perfectly and some uncertainty remains. As a result, Merenre's rule is dated to some time around the early 23rd century BC. The South Saqqara Stone Stone credits Merenre with a minimum reign of 11 to 13 years. This might agree with Merenre's highest attested date of Year after the 5th Count (Regnal Year 10 if the count was biennial) in a quarry inscription from Hatnub Inscription No.6.

Duration
During the Old Kingdom period, the Egyptians counted years from the beginning of the reign of the current king. These years were referred to by the number of cattle counts which had taken place since the reign's start. The cattle count was an important event aimed at evaluating the amount of taxes to be levied on the population. This involved counting cattle, oxen and small livestock. During the early Sixth Dynasty, this count was probably biennial, occurring every two years. Based on a regular biennial count, the South Saqqara Stone, a contemporary royal annals, credits Merenre with a minimum reign of 11 to 13 years, twice the figure of five to six years attributed to him by historical sources. The Egyptologists Ian Shaw and Paul Nicholson in a 1995 book raised Merenre I's reign from the traditional 6 year figure to 9 years. However, they were unaware of the contents of the South Saqqara Stone which was published in the same year by Baud & Dobrev and shows that Merenre had a minimum reign of 11 years with no co-regency with his father, Pepi I. 

He also began a process of royal consolidation, appointing Weni as the first governor of all of Upper Egypt and expanding the power of several other governors. While he was once assumed to have died at an early age, recent archaeological discoveries discount this theory. Two contemporary objects suggests that Merenre's reign lasted slightly more than a decade. The South Saqqara Stone Annals preserves his Year after the 2nd Count whereas Merenre's Year after the 5th Count (Year 10 if the count was biennial) is attested in a quarry inscription from Hatnub Inscription No.6, according to Anthony Spalinger.

Accession to the throne: coregency 
Pepi's rule seem to have been troubled at times, with at least one conspiracy against him hatched by one of his harem consorts. This may have given him the impetus to ally himself with Khui, the nomarch of Coptos, by marrying his daughters, queens Ankhesenpepi I and II. Egyptologist Naguib Kanawati conjectures that Pepi faced another conspiracy toward the end of his reign, in which his vizier Rawer may have been involved. To support his theory, Kanawati observes that Rawer's image in his tomb has been desecrated, with his name, hands and feet chiselled off, while this same tomb is dated to the second half of Pepi's reign on stylistic grounds. Kanawati further posits that the conspiracy may have aimed at having someone else made heir to the throne at the expense of the designated heir Merenre. Because of this failed conspiracy, Pepi I may have taken the drastic step of crowning Merenre during his own reign, thereby creating the earliest documented coregency in the history of Egypt. That such a coregency took place was first proposed by Étienne Drioton who pointed to a gold pendant bearing the names of both Pepi I and Merenre I as living kings, implying that both ruled concurrently for some time. In support of this hypothesis, Hans Goedicke mentions an inscription dated to Merenre's tenth year of reign from Hatnub, contradicting Manetho's figure of seven years for him. This could be evidence that Merenre dated the start of his reign before the end of his father's reign, as a coregency would permit.

A possible further piece of evidence for a coregency is given by two copper statues uncovered in an underground store beneath the floor of a Ka-chapel of Pepi in Hierakonpolis. There the Egyptologist James Quibell uncovered a statue of King Khasekhemwy of the Second Dynasty, a terracotta lion cub made during the Thinite era, a golden mask representing Horus and two copper statues. Originally fashioned by hammering plates of copper over a wooden base, these statues had been disassembled, placed inside one another and then sealed with a thin layer of engraved copper bearing the titles and names of Pepi I "on the first day of the Heb Sed" feast. The two statues were symbolically "trampling underfoot the Nine bows"—the enemies of Egypt—a stylized representation of Egypt's conquered foreign subjects. While the identity of the larger adult figure as Pepi I is revealed by the inscription, the identity of the smaller statue showing a younger person remains unresolved. The most common hypothesis among Egyptologists is that the young man shown is Merenre. As Alessandro Bongioanni and Maria Croce write: "[Merenre] was publicly associated as his father's successor on the occasion of the Jubilee [the Heb Sed feast]. The placement of his copper effigy inside that of his father would therefore reflect the continuity of the royal succession and the passage of the royal sceptre from father to son before the death of the pharaoh could cause a dynastic split." Alternatively, Bongioanni and Croce have also proposed the smaller statue may represent "a more youthful Pepy I, reinvigorated by the celebration of the Jubilee ceremonies".

The existence of the coregency remains uncertain. According to Egyptologists Jaromir Málek and Miroslav Verner, Merenre Nemtyemsaf I ascended the throne at an early age and died young. According to Verner, he may have been appointed coregent by his father Pepy I Meryre who might have tried to make the succession of the throne more secure following an earlier conspiracy. The hypothesis of a coregency is disputed by Vassil Dobrev and Michel Baud who analysed an heavily damaged contemporary royal annals, now known as the South Saqqara Stone. The annals, which may have been written under either Merenre or Pepi II, strongly suggest that Merenre directly succeeded his father in power with no traces in direct support of an interregnum or coregency. More precisely, the document preserves the record of Pepi I's final year and proceeds immediately to the first year of Merenre. Furthermore, the shape and size of the stone on which the annals are inscribed makes it more probable that Merenre did not start to count his years of reign until soon after the death of his father. Furthermore, William J. Murnane writes that the gold pendant's context is unknown, making its significance regarding the coregency difficult to appraise. The copper statues are similarly inconclusive as the identity of the smaller one, and whether they originally formed a group, remains uncertain.

Foreign relations

Merenre sent mining expeditions to Wadi Hammamat to collect greywacke and siltstone. Alabaster was extracted from 
Hatnub in the Eastern Desert, a location where an expedition under the leadership of Weni was also tasked with quarrying of a very large travertine altar stone for the pyramid of Merenre. In parallel, Egypt maintained diplomatic and trade relations with Byblos.

During Merenre's reign Lower Nubia became the focus of Egypt's foreign policy interests. Two rock reliefs depict the king receiving the submission of Nubian chieftains, the earliest of which, located on the ancient route from Aswan to Philae, shows Merenre standing on the symbol for the union of the two lands suggesting that it was carved during his first year of reign. Toward the end of the Old Kingdom period, Nubia saw the arrival of the C-Group people from the south. Centered at Kerma they struggled intermittently with Egypt and its allies over the region which was the source of incense, ebony, animal skins, ivory and exotic animals brought back by caravans. Three Egyptian expeditions were sent by Merenre to procure luxury goods from Lower Nubia, were tribes had united to form a state, into the land of Yam, possibly modern-day Dongola. These expeditions took place under the direction of the nomarch of Elephantine Harkhuf. The first one lasted for seven months while the second took eight months. On the third expedition Harkhuf encountered the king of Yam who was then warring against Tjemehu people, possibly Libyans, and joined his forces with those of Yam to defeat their adversaries, thereby gaining riches. 
 

After these events, in the  year of fifth cattle count since the beginning of his reign, Merenre may have travelled south to Elephantine from his capital to receive the submission of Nubian chieftains, as possibly indicated by his second relief pertaining to the matter, located opposite the cataract island of El-Hesseh. This relief, explicitly dated to the year of his fifth cattle count, mentions the rulers of the Nubian lands of Medja, Irertjt and Wawat kissing the ground and giving praise. On the same occasion, he might also have visited the temple of Satet on Elephantine island to renew a granite shrine erected by Pepy I.

Besides Harkhuf, another Egyptian high official who was active in Nubia at the time was Weni, who began his career under Teti, rose through the ranks of the administration under Pepi I Meryre when he became commander of the army and was finally made into the governor of Upper Egypt by Merenre. As chief of the army Weni hired Nubian mercenaries for his military campaigns in Sinai and the Levant, mercenaries which were also frequently employed as police force.
Overall, Egyptian activities in Lower Nubia were sufficiently important during the later sixth dynasty that works were undertaken under Weni's direction excavating a canal near modern-day Shellal running parallel to the Nile in order to facilitate the navigation of the first-cataract.

Pyramid

The pyramid of Merenre which the Ancient Egyptians named Khanefermerenre, variously translated as "Merenre appears in glory and his beautiful", "The perfection of Merenre rises", was built at South Saqqara.

The inner passages of the pyramid were inscribed with the pyramid texts. A mummy was uncovered in the burial chamber. Forensic analyses indicated that it belonged to a young man, with possible traces of his sidelock of youth still visible. The identity of the mummy remains uncertain as Elliott Smith, who performed the analyses, observed that the technique employed for the wrapping was typical of the eighteenth dynasty (fl. c. 1550–1292 BC) rather than the sixth. Re-wrapping of older mummies are known to have occurred so that this observation does not necessarily preclude that the mummy be that of Merenre.

For the remainder of the Old Kingdom period, the funerary cult of Merenre I had active priests even outside of his Saqqara mortuary temple, for example inscriptions in Elkab attest to the presence of priests of his cult officiating in or in the vicinity of the local temple of Nekhbet.

Notes

References

Bibliography 

 
 
 
 
 
 
 
 
 
 
 
 
 
 
 
 
 
 
 
 
 
 
 
 
 
 
  
 
 
 
 
 
 
 
 
 
 
 
 
 
 

23rd-century BC Pharaohs
Pharaohs of the Sixth Dynasty of Egypt
23rd-century BC deaths